Zijldijk is a village in the municipality of Eemsdelta, Groningen, the Netherlands.

It is located along the N46 road between the city of Groningen and the Eemshaven seaport.

History 
The village was first mentioned in 1424 as "Ubba Ffockema up den Zyldyck", and means sluice and dike. In 1272, a sluice was built at the site in the newly poldered land around 't Zandt. In 1317, a dike was built northwards towards Uithuizermeeden. In 1444, the land to the east of Zijldijk was poldered and the sluice became obsolete.

Zijldijk has three churches. The Mennomite church was built in 1772 in a non conspicuous barn-like building. It is still in use as a church. The Dutch Reformed church has been reconstructed as a village house. The Reformed Church was constructed in 1886, and nowadays serves as a care facility.

Zijldijk was home to 454 people in 1840.

Gallery

References

External links 
 

Populated places in Groningen (province)
Eemsdelta